Bertamyia is a genus of flat-footed flies (insects in the family Platypezidae). There are two described species Bertamyia notata and Bertamyia umacibise.

References

Further reading

External links

 

Platypezidae
Platypezoidea genera
Articles created by Qbugbot